A Brighter Summer Day is the debut studio album by Burning Star Core, released in February 2002 by Thin Wrist Recordings. After almost ten years of numerous private recordings and self-released recordings, the album marked the first time the project received wide distribution, with five hundred pressings in vinyl.

Track listing

Personnel
Adapted from the A Brighter Summer Day liner notes.
 C. Spencer Yeh – violin (A), electronics (A), computer (B), mixing (A), editing (A)
Production and additional personnel
 John Golden – mastering
 Peter Kolovos – design
 Michael Manning – design
 Chris Rosing – electronics (A), recording (A), photography
 The Wyvern – painting

Release history

References

External links 
 A Brighter Summer Day at Discogs (list of releases)

2002 debut albums
Burning Star Core albums
Instrumental albums